Mesodermochelys is an extinct genus of sea turtle known from the Campanian to the Maastrichtian (Late Cretaceous) of what today is Japan. One species is known, the type species M. undulatus; it was given its binomial name by Ren Hirayama and Tsutomu Chitoku in 1996. Studies of its skull indicate that it was a primitive member of the Dermochelyidae (leatherback turtle family) that was closely related to the Protostegidae. It has been described as the best representative of Mesozoic dermochelyids.

Description
 
Like other dermochelyids, Mesodermochelys had elongated front flippers. One fossil found in Japan's Kagawa Prefecture had a carapace estimated to be 1.3 metres in length.  Only the neural or spinal scutes, or individual plates, of the carapace are well grooved.

Specimens
The holotype specimen of Mesodermochelys undulatus Hobetsu Museum (HMG) 5 was collected in 1980 from the Maastrichtian Hakobuchi Formation (Yezo Group) in Inasato, Hobetsu, Hokkaido, Japan. It comprises a supraoccipital and partial postcranial skeleton and was reported in 1996 along with 14 referred specimens collected between 1977 and 1994 and also reposited at HMG.

In October 2005, Yoshiyuki Hattori uncovered a skull presumed to be Mesodermochelys, from an unnamed Santonian-aged interval of the Yezo Group in the Hokkaido Prefecture. The skull is very well preserved but is missing most of the dermal roof bones through weathering. It was donated to the defunct Historical Museum of Hokkaido, which has since been integrated into and replaced by the Hokkaido Museum.

References

Late Cretaceous turtles of Asia
Dermochelyidae
Cretaceous animals of Asia
Fossil taxa described in 1996
Prehistoric turtle genera
Campanian genus first appearances
Monotypic prehistoric reptile genera
Fossils of Japan
Maastrichtian genus extinctions